Bell and Howell LLC is a U.S.-based services organization and former manufacturer of cameras, lenses, and   motion picture machinery, founded in 1907 by two projectionists, and originally headquartered in Wheeling, Illinois. The company is now headquartered in Durham, North Carolina, and currently sells production mail equipment, buy-online-pickup-in-store (BOPIS) smart locker and kiosk solutions, and provides maintenance services for automated, industrial equipment in enterprise-level companies. Since 2010, the Bell + Howell brand name has been extensively licensed for a diverse range of consumer electronics products.

History

According to its charter, the Bell & Howell Company was incorporated on February 17, 1907. It was duly recorded in the Cook County Record Book eight days later. The first meeting of stockholders took place in the office of Attorney W. G. Strong on February 19 at 10 a.m. (10:00 CT). The first board of directors was chosen for a term of one year: Donald Joseph Bell (1869–1934), chairman; Albert Summers Howell (1879–1951), secretary; and Marguerite V. Bell (wife of Donald Bell), vice chairman.

The firm built its name making products for the motion picture industry. Bell & Howell's best known contribution to Hollywood is its creation of the long time gold standard of cameras. The Bell & Howell 2709 was the first all metal, commercially available motion picture camera, and it dominated the market from 1919-1958.  The 2709 was so expensive that only Charlie Chaplin and three other people owned one, while the rest were owned by studios.

Bell & Howell also contributed to the movie industry through various inventions that improved the quality of the projected image in the movie theater. The Kinodrome 35-mm projector mechanism, introduced in 1907, steadied the image and reduced the annoying "flicker" that can occur during motion-picture projection.  The 35-mm perforator, introduced in 1910, set the standard throughout the industry as to the expected distance and width of the sprocket holes running on each side of the 35-mm film; before this there had been no agreed upon standard

Bell & Howell further dominated the movie market by revolutionizing printing; they developed a continuous printing process in 1911. Through this step, Bell & Howell had effectively set the standards for 35-mm cameras, projection, film printing, and perforation for the entire industry.

Historically, Bell & Howell Co. was an important supplier of many different media technologies, and it produced numerous products such as:

Newsreel and amateur film cameras such as the Filmo (end of 1923) and Eyemo (1925), and Autoload EE (1956)
 Military Gun sight TYPE N-8
 Regular-8 and Super-8 film cameras and projectors (all models)
 16mm silent and sound projectors (all models); the famous Filmosound projectors dominated the market for many years
Slide projectors (2" × 2"; 5 cm x 5 cm)
 35mm filmstrip projectors
 Overhead presentation projectors (all models)
 Stereo cameras and stereo slide projectors through its TDC subsidiary
 Slide Cube Projector, circa 1970

In 1934, Bell & Howell introduced their first amateur 8mm movie projector, in 1935 the Filmo Straight Eight camera, and in 1936 the Double-Run Filmo 8. The 1938 Kodak cassette holding  of Double-Eight film was taken by the Filmo Auto-8 in 1940.

The firm added microfilm products in 1946.  In 1954, Bell & Howell purchased DeVry Industries' 16mm division.

Although known for manufacturing their film projectors, a partnership with Canon between 1961 and 1976 offered still cameras. Many of their 35mm SLR cameras were manufactured by Canon with the Bell & Howell logo or Bell & Howell/Canon in place of the Canon branding. The firm dropped the production of movie cameras by the end of the 1970s.

Bell & Howell was a supplier of media equipment for schools and offices. The film laboratory line is now a separate company, BHP Inc, which is a division of Research Technology International.

In 1960, Bell & Howell merged with an Electronics and Instrumentation company CEC,  Lennox Road, Basingstoke, UK.  This facility produced pressure transducers and other devices for applications in areas such as North Sea oil platforms, the chemical industry, and the Ariane Space vehicles. This division was divested to Transamerica Corporation in 1983.

In 1977, Bell & Howell signed an agreement with BASF to develop a new amateur videotape recorder, which would have made use of a  tape on which 28 of parallel tracks were to be recorded with the aid of a fixed head. The machine was expected to be ready by Christmas 1979, but did not reach the market.

Bell & Howell purchased University Microfilms International in the 1980s. UMI produced a product called ProQuest.

In the 2000s, Bell & Howell decided to focus on their information technology businesses. The imaging business was sold to Eastman Kodak, and the international mail business was sold to Pitney Bowes. On June 6, 2001, Bell & Howell became a ProQuest Company, which was then a publicly traded company, but is now a subsidiary of the private Cambridge Information Group. In September 2001, the remaining industrial businesses along with the Bell & Howell name were sold to private equity firm Glencoe Capital.

The company merged with the North American arm of Böwe Systec Inc. In 2003, Böwe Systec later acquired the entire company. It was known as Böwe Bell & Howell until 2011, when Versa Capital Management bought the company out of bankruptcy and renamed the company "Bell and Howell, LLC".

Based on the company's long history with motion picture equipment and other technologies, in 2010 consumer electronics manufacturer Elite Brands entered an agreement to license the Bell + Howell brand name to market lines of optical and imaging products including digital cameras and camcorders, binoculars, telescopes, lenses, and various camera accessories. Elite Brands similarly licenses the Minolta brand name for camcorders and digital cameras and is also the exclusive producer of Coleman electronics and optics products. BHH, LLC has also expanded licensing of the Bell + Howell brand name into a multitude of categories for a diverse range of products including lighting and security, personal care, tools, pest control, auto accessories and luggage.

In 2011 a digital video recorder was released featuring the Bell + Howell brand.

In 2017 the company spun off the mail sorting business, including vote by mail, to Fluence Automation, 
which was then acquired by BlueCrest Inc. in 2021.
BlueCrest had acquired the Pitney-Bowes document messaging business in 2018.

In December 2018, Versa Capital Management, LLC (“Versa”) announced the successful closing of the sale of Bell and Howell to Boston-based WestView Capital Partners (“WestView").

Apple II

Bell & Howell marketed a specially designed Apple II Plus computer to the educational market beginning in July 1979. The modified Apple had additional security elements for classroom use such as a tamper-proof cover. The case color was black but the inside was a standard Apple II Plus. The modified Apple II became known colloquially among computer enthusiasts as the "Darth Vader" Apple II for its black case design.

Education Group 
Bell & Howell founded an Education Group within the company in 1907. This Education Group created Bell & Howell Schools in 1966. In that same year, the Education Group purchased a controlling share of DeVry Institute of Technology. Two years later in 1968, Bell & Howell's Education Group, via a controlling interest in DeVry, acquired Ohio Institute of Technology in Columbus, Ohio. Over the years, the Education Group has bought and sold large interests in a variety of educational organizations and institutions, including Heathkit which supplied electronic kitsets for Bell & Howell courses.

Gallery

See also 
Charles H. Percy
BH Film perforation
TeleMation Inc. In 1977, TeleMation inc. became a division of Bell and Howell.
Pocket comparator
Gordon Bradt

References
Notes

Bibliography
 "Unlocking the Vault". Forbes. Dated November 13, 2000, viewed December 7, 2006
 BHP Inc Website viewed December 7, 2006

External links

European & International Sector. (Wayback Machine copy)
The Zapruder Camera Bell & Howell 414PD Director Series - Overview and User's Manual. (Wayback Machine copy)
 Bell & Howell at Made in Chicago Museum

Photography companies of the United States
Organizations awarded an Academy Honorary Award
Electronics companies established in 1907
Companies based in Cook County, Illinois
Movie cameras
Movie camera manufacturers
Articles containing video clips
1907 establishments in Illinois
Academy Award for Technical Achievement winners